Jón Ólafsson may refer to:

 Jón Ólafsson of Grunnavík (1705–1779), Icelandic scholar
 Jón Ólafsson (journalist) (1850–1916), Icelandic editor, journalist, and poet
 Jón Ólafsson (traveller) (–1679), Icelandic traveller to the East Indies
 Jón Axel Ólafsson, Icelandic radio personality, producer and manager
 Jón Þór Ólafsson (born 1977), Icelandic politician
 Jón Ólafsson (athlete) (born 1941), Icelandic Olympic athlete